Eduardo Herrera Aguirre (born 25 July 1988) is a Mexican former professional footballer who played as a forward.

Club career

UNAM 
Herrera made his senior team debut with Pumas UNAM on 24 July 2011 as a substitute in a match against San Luis. Herrera enjoyed a successful period between 2014 and 2016, being top scorer at the club during the first season.   The 2015–16 season proved to his most prolific, scoring 15 goals in 37 appearances, and finishing the 2015 Apertura runner-up with Pumas. Herrera also spent time on loan to Santos Laguna during the 2013–14 season, scoring five times in 21 appearances. He spent the beginning of 2017 on loan to Veracruz, starting in 12 of 13 games and scoring three goals.

Rangers 
Scottish club Rangers put in a bid reported to be £1.5m for Herrera, and he travelled to Glasgow at the beginning of June to discuss a move. After agreeing a deal Herrera had to wait on a work permit and visa but he finally joined Rangers on 22 June, the same day as fellow Mexican international Carlos Peña.

He made his competitive debut on 4 July in Rangers' 0–2 Europa League qualifying round loss to Luxembourg side Progrès Niedercorn; Herrera replaced Jordan Rossiter in the 77th minute of the match. He scored his first goal for Rangers on 27 August in the 3–1 league win at Ross County.

Santos Laguna (loan)
Herrera joined Mexican club Santos Laguna on loan for the 2018–19 season.

Club Necaxa (loan)
On 8 January 2019, Herrera transferred to Club Necaxa on loan for the remainder of the 2018–19 season. He scored his first goal for Necaxa on January 15 against Club America.
The loan was extended for the rest of the year on 15 July 2019.

Puebla
On 29 January 2020, Herrera joined Club Puebla permanently

Retirement
On 22 May 2022, Herrera announced his retirement from professional football.

International career 
In March 2015, Herrera earned a call up to the Mexico national team. On 31 March, Herrera scored his first goal with the national team in an international friendly match against Paraguay. He ended his national team career appearing 9 times and scoring a total of 3 times.

Career statistics

Club

International 
International appearances

International goals
Scores and results list Mexico's goal tally first.

Honours 
UNAM
Liga MX: Clausura 2009, Clausura 2011

References

External links 
 
 
 
 
 
 

1988 births
Living people
Association football forwards
Club Universidad Nacional footballers
Santos Laguna footballers
C.D. Veracruz footballers
Footballers from Mexico City
Mexican people of Basque descent
Liga MX players
Ascenso MX players
Mexico international footballers
2015 Copa América players
Rangers F.C. players
Club Necaxa footballers
Mexican expatriate footballers
Mexican footballers
Expatriate footballers in Scotland
Mexican expatriate sportspeople in Scotland
Scottish Professional Football League players